Morangos com Açúcar – O Filme (lit. "Morangos Com Açúcar – The Movie") is a 2012 Portuguese teen film, directed by Hugo de Sousa and based on the TV series with the same name. It stars Sara Matos, Lourenço Ortigão and others.

Plot
The story takes place on a summer camp in Portugal where old friends find each other one more time to participate in a bands competition. Margarida and Rui, a couple, met a famous singer named Tatiana who is starting her career in Portugal, they developed their friendship until Tatiana falls in love with Rui, making Margarida give up on the competition.

Cast

Main cast
 as Margarida
Lourenço Ortigão as Rui
 as Missy M
Ricardo Sá as Leo
Sara Prata as Becas
Gabriela Barros as Marta
Lia Carvalho as Mariana
Carolina Frias as Alice
Filipa Areosa as Ana Rita
David Carreira as Lourenço
Catarina Siqueira as Anabela
Diogo Branco as Gil
João Secundino as Kiko
Pedro Macedo as Tozé
Tiago Costa as Ricardo
João Maria Bonneville as Sebastião
Inês Seco as Lili
João Pcheco as Fred

Recurring cast
Diogo Lemos as André
Isaac Alfaiate as André
Carlos Cunha as Diamantino
Luke D'Eça as Ed
Miguel Santiago as Fábio
Ivo Lucas as Gonçalo
 as Jorge
Francisco Borges as Jota
Nélson Patrão as Link
Tiago Carreira as Lourenço
Maria Henrique as Maria
Joana Duarte as Matilde
Jéssica Athayde as Mimi
Helena Costa as Mónica
Mafalda Teixeira as Patrícia
João Catarré as Pipo
Pedro Carvalho as Ricardo
Guilherme Filipe as Rogério Sapinho
David Gama as Sérgio
 as Simão
Rita Pereira as Soraia
Luís Lourenço as Tiago
Vítor Fonseca as Zé Milho

Reception
As of 11 November 2012, the film had a box office gross of €1,207,647.10.

References

External links

Films based on television series
Portuguese drama films
2012 drama films
2012 films